Alto Alegre do Pindaré is a municipality in the state of Maranhão in the Northeast region of Brazil.

The city has one of the most important and largest railway stations on the Carajás Railway line.

See also
List of municipalities in Maranhão

References

Municipalities in Maranhão